Bernard Brizay, born in Rouen (department of Seine Maritime in France) in August 1941, has studied History, teaching History of Art, before he became a journalist (reporter at large)

Resume 
License and Master of History (writing a thesis about « French Voyageurs in Rome in 18th and 19th Centuries)

License of French Literature and History of Art

1969: Journalist in political and economical famous French magazines (Entreprise (Enterprise), Le Nouvel Économiste (The New Economist)

1976: publishing his first book  (Editions du Seuil) Le Patronat francais (The French Employers)

1977: expatriated in United States for 6 months, invited by The Eisenhower Foundation (main office in Philadelphia) to conduct a study about the American Employers. He comes back with another book (PUF Editions) Le Patronat américain.

Publishing several books about political, economical and social matters.

1979: Journalist for French TV channel TF1, in the economical serie called L'enjeu (The stake)

1979 Reporter at large for famous French daily newspaper Le Figaro

2005: Retiring from his journalist career.

2010 Visiting Professor at Shenyang University (Liaoning)

Bernard Brizay discovered China on his first visit in August 1979. Incredibly passionate for China and Chinese people since then, he returns frequently to China (20 travels up to July 2014)

October 2000: when visiting the ruins of Yuanming Yuan palace (ancient Summer Palace in Beijing) he immediately felt he should write an historical book about this unprecedented tragedy.

Publications 

2003: Le Sac du palais d'Été, seconde guerre de l'Opium (Editions du Rocher) – The Looting of Summer Palace, Second Opium War - translated and published in China in 2005 by The classical Editions of Zhejiang (Zhejiang Gu Ji Chu Ban She) and published between the France-China Cross-Cultural Years, thanks to the Translation Fu Lei program with the help of French Ministry of Foreign Affairs.  This book was rewarded in 2007 with the Wenjin Price (Bridge of Culture) granted by the National Library of China, selected among 40 books chosen by 120 million internet users. The book has been published several times, last publishing in 2011. Will be soon translated in English.

2007: Les Trois soeurs Soong. Une dynastie chinoise du XXe siècle (Editions du Rocher) – The Three Soong Sisters. A Chinese Dynasty in 20th Century.

2008: Le Roman de Pékin. (Editions du Rocher) – Beijing Novel.

2010: Shanghai, le Paris de l'Orient. (Editions Flammarion-Pygmalion). Rewarded with French Auguste Pavie Price, granted by the French Academy of Sciences of Overseas Territories. The book is also translated in Chinese.

2013: La France en Chine, du XVIIe siècle à nos jours (Editions Perrin), will be translated in Chinese at the occasion of the 50th anniversary of acknowledgment of People's Republic of China, under Mao Zedong leadership by general de Gaulle in 1964. The book will be presented at the Shanghai Book Fair in August 2014.

Notes and references 
In French
 Commémoration marquant le 150ème anniversaire du pillage du Parc de Yuanminyuan, Radio Chine Internationale
 
 Blog Changement de Société
  
 Octobre 1860 : Le sac du Palais d’Eté de Pékin
 Un historien français appelle au devoir de mémoire à l’occasion du 150e anniversaire du sac de l’ancien Palais d’Eté, Agence de presse Xinhua, 19/10/2010
 Pillage du Palais d’été de Pékin : l’impossible restitution, AFP, 22/10/2010
 
 Les Chinois peinent à récupérer les trésors pillés du Palais d’été de Pékin en octobre 1860, Le Monde, 30/10/2010

See also 
 First Opium War 
 Second Opium War 
 Summer Palace

External links 
 Eisenhower Foundation Web Site
 Site Faguowenhua (in French)
 Prix Fu Lei de la traduction : découvrez les lauréats 2012 ! (in French)

1941 births
French journalists
20th-century French historians
Living people
French male non-fiction writers
21st-century French historians